Arenig Fawr South Ridge Top is a top of Arenig Fawr in southern Snowdonia, North Wales. It lies in area of rocky knolls and small tarns, found on the broad south ridge of Arenig Fawr.

The summit, marked by a few stones, is a top of the highest rocky outcrop found in the area. The views are limited, blocked by the bulk of Arenig Fawr. A path leads down the west flank of the ridge towards Moel Llyfnant.

References

External links
 www.geograph.co.uk : photos of Arenig Fawr and surrounding area

Nuttalls
Mountains and hills of Snowdonia
Mountains and hills of Gwynedd
Llanycil

cy:Arenig Fawr